"Rhythm of Love" is a power ballad by German heavy metal band Scorpions. It was released on Harvest/EMI as a single in 1988.

Music video
The video for the song, which depicts the band performing in a science fiction setting, features the model Joan Severance as one of several women enjoying the band's performance. Its video has been seen as setting "a new low for [hair metal].

Reception
The single peaked at number six on the US Mainstream Rock Chart. It also attained the No. 75 position on the U.S. Billboard Hot 100, while reaching No. 59 on the UK Singles Chart.

References

Scorpions (band) songs
1988 singles
Songs written by Klaus Meine
Songs written by Rudolf Schenker
1988 songs
Harvest Records singles
EMI Records singles